The Arnik River is a river of Guyana, a tributary of the Potaro River.

The Arnik River is seen as a common boundary between Amerindian villages of Chenapou and Karisparu. It was a point of conflict when the land title was seen as unfavorable to Chenapou.

The surrounding forest area was a site for balata bleeding.

See also
List of rivers of Guyana

References

Bibliography 
Rand McNally, The New International Atlas, 1993.

Rivers of Guyana